This list of tallest buildings in Detroit ranks skyscrapers and high rises in the U.S. city of Detroit, Michigan by height. The tallest skyscraper in Detroit is the 73-story Detroit Marriott at the Renaissance Center, which rises  along Detroit's International Riverfront. It is the tallest building in the state of Michigan, the 97th-tallest building in the United States, and the second tallest hotel building in the Western Hemisphere. Another famous skyscraper is One Detroit Center, which stands as the 2nd-tallest building in the city and the state.

Detroit's history of skyscrapers began in 1889, with completion of the historic 10-story Hammond Building—considered the city's first steel-framed skyscraper.It was followed by the Savings Bank Building in 1895, the Majestic Building in 1896, and the Union Trust Building in 1896. Detroit witnessed a massive building boom during the Roaring Twenties, resulting in the construction of many of the city's ornate skyscrapers, including the Penobscot, Guardian, Fisher, Buhl, Stott, and Broderick.

One Woodward Avenue, which rises , was the  tallest building constructed in the city during the 1960s. Detroit is the site of eight skyscrapers at least  in height and twenty-seven at least  in height.  Overall, the skyline of Detroit is ranked (based upon existing and under construction buildings over ) third in the Midwestern United States (after Chicago and Minneapolis) and fourteenth in the United States, after New York City, Chicago, Miami, Houston, Los Angeles, Dallas, Atlanta, San Francisco, Boston, Las Vegas, Seattle, Philadelphia, and Minneapolis.

The most recently constructed skyscrapers in the city are One Detroit Center, completed in 1993, and Hollywood Casino at Greektown, completed in 2009. The latter rises  and contains 30 floors. The city has received many significant restoration projects, which include the 29 story Westin Book Cadillac Hotel; originally built in 1924 and restored in 2008, it rises .


Tallest buildings
This list ranks Detroit skyscrapers that stand at least 300 feet (91 m) tall, based on standard height measurement. This includes spires and architectural details but does not include antenna masts. The "Year" column indicates the year a building was completed.

Tallest buildings by pinnacle height

This list ranks Detroit skyscrapers based on their pinnacle height, which includes radio masts and antennas. As architectural features and spires can be regarded as subjective, some skyscraper enthusiasts prefer this method of measurement. Standard architectural height measurement, which excludes antennas in building height, is included for comparative purposes.

Tallest proposed or under construction

Tallest under construction 
This lists high-rises and skyscrapers under construction or topped-out in Detroit that are expected to rise at least 200 feet (61 m).

Timeline of tallest buildings

This lists buildings that once held the title of tallest building in Detroit. For most of Detroit's earlier years, the tallest buildings in the city were churches and government buildings with their steeples. The first skyscraper in the city is usually considered the Hammond Building, completed in 1889. However, since the 10-story building did not surpass the steeple of the Fort Street Presbyterian Church, it never became a city record holder. The first skyscraper to have the distinction of being Detroit's tallest building was the Ford Building, completed in 1909.

Tallest buildings in Detroit's suburban cities
This list ranks buildings in Detroit's suburban municipalities that stand at least 200 feet (61 m) tall, based on standard height measurement. Existing structures are included for ranking purposes based on present height.

Notes
A. ^ General Motors, the owner of the Detroit Marriott at the Renaissance Center, maintains that the building has 73 floors. Hines Interests, the property management firm for the building, gives a floor count of 74, while architect Skidmore, Owings and Merrill gives a floor count of 75. Emporis and other building database sites usually give the floor count as 70, while other sources state 73 stories. This table uses the floor count of 73 as stated officially by the building's owner.
Source of Skyline ranking information: SkyscraperPage.com diagrams: New York City, Chicago, Miami, Houston, Los Angeles, Dallas, Atlanta, San Francisco, Boston, Las Vegas, Seattle, Philadelphia, Pittsburgh, Jersey City, Minneapolis, Detroit, Denver.
C. The capitol of Michigan was relocated to Lansing in 1847, and the original capitol building was destroyed in a fire in 1893.
D. This building was destroyed in 1961.
E. ^ St. Joseph Church, completed in 1873, tied the height of the Detroit City Hall. The city therefore had two tallest buildings for a period of 4 years, until the Fort Street Presbyterian Church was completed in 1877.
F. This building was constructed as the Book-Cadillac Hotel, but is now officially known as the Westin Book-Cadillac Hotel.

References
General

Specific

External links

Diagram of Detroit skyscrapers on SkyscraperPage.com

 
Detroit
Buildings, tallest
Tallest in Detroit